Kenneth Peter Pugh Olavarría (born 22 October 1959) is a Chilean marine and politician who currently serves as Senator of Chile. An independent, Pugh was elected as a candidate sponsored by the center-right party Renovación Nacional.

References

External links
 
 BCN Profile

1959 births
Living people
Chilean people
The Mackay School alumni
Arturo Prat Naval Academy alumni
Pontifical Catholic University of Valparaíso alumni
National Renewal (Chile) politicians
Senators of the LV Legislative Period of the National Congress of Chile
Senators of the LVI Legislative Period of the National Congress of Chile